Oncidium hydrophilum is a species of orchid found from Brazil to Paraguay.

References

External links 

hydrophilum
Flora of Paraguay
Orchids of Brazil